is Nightmare's second full-length studio album. It peaked at #29 in the Oricon Charts. In this album, they introduced a small preview of the new sound of Nightmare by adding an extra part for an acoustic guitar in two songs, Travel and Shian/Cyan, and a twist of jazz fusion in Underdog. Due to the spelling and pronunciation of 'livid' in Japanese the album has sometimes been incorrectly referred to as Libido.

Track listing

Single Information
 Varuna
Release Date: April 21, 2004
Oricon Chart Peak Position: #29
 
Release Date: July 22, 2004
Oricon Chart Peak Position: #21
 
Release Date: October 21, 2004
Oricon Chart Peak Position: #22

References

Nightmare (Japanese band) albums
2004 albums